Julian Birkinshaw  (born 16 October 1964) is a British academic. He is Professor of Strategy and Entrepreneurship at the London Business School, where he is the Academic Director of the Deloitte Institute of Innovation and Entrepreneurship. He is the author of four books on management.

Early life
Julian Birkinshaw earned a BSc in Geology from Durham University, followed by a Master of Business Administration and PhD from the Ivey Business School at the University of Western Ontario.

Career
Birkinshaw is Professor of Strategy and Entrepreneurship at the London Business School, where he is the Academic Director of the Deloitte Institute of Innovation and Entrepreneurship.

Birkinshaw is the author of four books on management. His first book, Entrepreneurship in the Global Firm, published in 2000, was reviewed by William G. Egelhoff of Fordham University in the Journal of International Business Studies. His fourth book, Becoming a Better Boss: Why Good Management is So Difficult, published in 2013, was reviewed in the Financial Times and the MIT Sloan Management Review.

Honours
In 2012, Birkinshaw was elected a Fellow of the British Academy (FBA). In 2015, he was elected a Fellow of the Academy of Social Sciences (FAcSS). He is also a Fellow the Academy of International Business, and of the Advanced Institute of Management Research.

Works

As an author

As a co-author

As a co-editor

References

External links
Official website
Faculty webpage

Living people
University of Western Ontario alumni
Academics of London Business School
Fellows of the Academy of Social Sciences
Fellows of the British Academy
1964 births
Alumni of Collingwood College, Durham